Navcam, short for navigational camera, is a type of camera found on certain robotic rovers or spacecraft used for navigation without interfering with scientific instruments. Navcams typically take wide angle photographs that are used to plan the next moves of the vehicle or object tracking.

Overview
The Mars Curiosity rover has two pairs of black and white navigation cameras mounted on the mast to support ground navigation. The cameras have a 45 degree angle of view and use visible light to capture stereoscopic 3-D imagery. These cameras, like those on the Mars Pathfinder missions support use of the ICER image compression format.

European Space Agency Rosetta spacecraft used a single camera with 5 degree field of view and 12 bit 1024x1024px resolution allowing for visual tracking on each of spacecraft approaches to the asteroids and finally the comet.

Gallery

See also
Astrionics
Hazard avoidance camera (Hazcam)
Panoramic camera (Pancam)
Optical, Spectroscopic, and Infrared camera OSIRIS
List of NASA cameras on spacecraft
Mars rover

References

Space imagers
Spacecraft instruments
Mars imagers
Mars Pathfinder
Mars Exploration Rover mission
Mars Science Laboratory instruments
Navigational equipment